is a Japanese manga artist. Rikdo is a graduate of Kyushu Sangyo University and lives in Dazaifu, Fukuoka. His most popular work is Excel Saga, a manga which he describes as a work dealing with the everyday aspects of living in Japan. The anime version of Excel Saga contains stories from the first five volumes of the manga, and even features Rikdo as a character (voiced by Wataru Takagi).

History 
Rikudō started out by drawing adult doujinshi in 1990 under the circle name Genkotsuten, and Gebokudou. He also supervises the Rokudoukan circle, that was recently renamed Rikudou Juku. His most popular work, Excel Saga, was based on a doujinshi that he drew for comic market called Municipal Force Daitenzin, in 1994. To this day Rikudō continues to participate in doujinshi works from time to time. In 1996 he made his major debut with Excel Saga, which was published by Young King OUR's, and lasted for 27 volumes, or until 2011.

Works

Assistants 

 Satou Shouji
 Ikami Hajime

References

External links
  
 六道館
 六道神士 (@rikudou_koushi) - Twitter

Manga artists from Fukuoka Prefecture
1970 births
Living people
Excel Saga
People from Dazaifu, Fukuoka